Leandro Marcelo Maygua Ríos (born 12 September 1992) is a Bolivian footballer who plays as a midfielder for Universitario de Sucre.

International career
Maygua made his debut for Bolivia in a September 2013 FIFA World Cup qualification match against Paraguay.

References

External links
 
 Profile - Bolívar
 

1992 births
Living people
People from Tarija
Association football midfielders
Bolivian footballers
Bolivia international footballers
Bolivian Primera División players
Club Bolívar players
Universitario de Sucre footballers